John Burt (15 April 1877 – 29 April 1935) was a Scottish field hockey player. He competed in the 1908 Summer Olympics as a member of the Scottish team, for the United Kingdom, which won the bronze medal. His brother, Alexander, also was a member of the Scottish team.

References

External links
 
John Burt's profile at Sports Reference.com

1877 births
1935 deaths
Scottish male field hockey players
Olympic field hockey players of Great Britain
British male field hockey players
Field hockey players at the 1908 Summer Olympics
Olympic bronze medallists for Great Britain
Olympic medalists in field hockey
Scottish Olympic medallists
Medalists at the 1908 Summer Olympics